is a railway station on the Nippō Main Line operated by Kyūshū Railway Company in Kitsuki, Ōita, Japan.

Lines

Layout 
The station consists of a side and an island platform serving three tracks. The station building is a modern concrete block structure. It houses a staffed ticket window, a waiting area and an automatic ticket vending machine. There is an accessibility ramp to the station building from the forecourt but a footbridge is needed to access the island platform.

The station is not staffed by JR Kyushu but a kan'i itaku agent is on site and manages the ticket window, which is equipped with a POS machine.

Adjacent stations

History
The Kyushu Railway was nationalised on 1 July 1907. Japanese Government Railways (JGR), designated the track as the Hōshū Main Line on 12 October 1909 and expanded it southwards in phases, with Naka-Yamaga opening as the new southern terminus on 15 December 1910. On 15 December 1923, the Hōshū Main Line was renamed the Nippō Main Line. With the privatization of Japanese National Railways (JNR), the successor of JGR, on 1 April 1987, the station came under the control of JR Kyushu.

Passenger statistics
In fiscal 2015, there were a total of 84,331 boarding passengers, giving a daily average of 231 passengers.

See also
List of railway stations in Japan

References

External links

  

Railway stations in Ōita Prefecture
Railway stations in Japan opened in 1910